Ángel Vicioso Arcos (born 13 April 1977) is a Spanish former road racing cyclist, who competed professionally between 1999 and 2017 for the , , Relax–GAM, LA–MSS,  and  squads.

Major results

1999
 6th Overall Vuelta a Asturias
2000
 2nd Overall Vuelta a La Rioja
1st Stage 2
 3rd GP Miguel Induráin
2001
 1st GP Miguel Induráin
 1st Clásica de Sabiñánigo
 1st Stage 4 Volta ao Alentejo
 6th Clásica a los Puertos de Guadarrama
 9th Subida al Naranco
2002
 1st GP Miguel Induráin
 1st Klasika Primavera
 5th Trofeo Luis Puig
2003
 Volta a Catalunya
1st Points classification
1st Stages 1 (TTT) & 7
 1st Stage 1 (TTT) Vuelta a España
 2nd GP Miguel Induráin
 7th Milano–Torino
 9th Overall Tour of the Basque Country
1st Stage 2
 9th Trofeo Luis Puig
 9th Amstel Gold Race
2004
 4th GP Miguel Induráin
 4th Gran Premio de Llodio
 7th Overall Vuelta a Castilla y León
 9th Overall Tirreno–Adriatico
 9th Overall Euskal Bizikleta
1st Stages 3 & 4b (ITT)
 10th Liège–Bastogne–Liège
2005
 Euskal Bizikleta
1st Stages 1 & 4a
 3rd GP Miguel Induráin
 6th La Flèche Wallonne
 7th Overall Tirreno–Adriatico
 10th Liège–Bastogne–Liège
2006
 4th Overall Tour de Suisse
1st Stage 4
 6th Overall Vuelta a Murcia
2007
 1st Stage 1 Vuelta a Asturias
 2nd Overall Tour of the Basque Country
1st Stage 3
 2nd Overall Vuelta a la Comunidad de Madrid
1st Points classification
1st Stages 1 & 3
 2nd Overall Vuelta a Murcia
 10th Klasika Primavera
2008
 1st  Overall Vuelta a Asturias
1st Stage 1
 3rd Overall GP Internacional Paredes Rota dos Móveis
 4th Overall Vuelta a la Comunidad de Madrid
1st Stage 2
 6th Overall Volta ao Alentejo
2009
 1st Stage 6 Vuelta a Asturias
 2nd Vuelta a La Rioja
 8th Subida al Naranco
 9th Overall GP Internacional Paredes Rota dos Móveis
 10th Klasika Primavera
2010
 1st Vuelta a La Rioja
 1st Gran Premio de Llodio
 9th Overall Vuelta a Asturias
1st  Points classification
1st Stage 2
2011
 1st GP Industria & Artigianato di Larciano
 1st Stage 3 Giro d'Italia
 3rd Trofeo Laigueglia
 6th Montepaschi Strade Bianche
 9th Overall Settimana Internazionale di Coppi e Bartali
1st Stage 1b (TTT)
 10th Giro dell'Appennino
2012
 7th Gran Premio Industria e Commercio di Prato
 10th Overall Paris–Nice
2013
 10th GP Miguel Induráin
2015
 1st GP Miguel Induráin
 1st Prologue (TTT) Tour of Austria
2016
 2nd Road race, National Road Championships

Grand Tour general classification results timeline

References

External links

1977 births
Living people
Spanish male cyclists
Tour de Suisse stage winners
Spanish Giro d'Italia stage winners
People from Comunidad de Calatayud
Sportspeople from the Province of Zaragoza
European Games competitors for Spain
Cyclists at the 2015 European Games
Cyclists from Aragon